Real to Reel, Vol. 2 is a studio album by hard rock band Tesla, and the second part of the band's covers album Real to Reel, released in retail outlets on September 25, 2007.
The album was initially only available to people attending the band's 2007 concert tour during August 2007, when the first volume was released, but then became available at retail outlets in September. It was also released free with August 2007 copies of the UK magazine Classic Rock.

Like the first Real to Reel album, the second volume also features covers of classic rock songs from the 1960s and 1970s that inspired and influenced the band, recorded by Tesla in their own style using analog tape and vintage equipment.

Track listing

Personnel
Jeff Keith - lead vocals
Frank Hannon - guitar, backing vocals
Brian Wheat - bass, piano, backing vocals
Troy Luccketta - drums, percussion
Dave Rude - guitars, backing vocals

External links
Tesla official web site

2007 albums
Covers albums
Tesla (band) albums